The 2017 Valentin Granatkin Memorial Cup is its 17th edition after dissolution of the USSR. Slovenia under-18 is its defending champion.

Groups
All times are Further-eastern European Time (UTC+03:00).

Group A

Group B

Group C

Group D

Definition of Places

Places 9–16

Places 13–16

15th Place

13th Place

Places 9–12

11th Place

9th Place

Quarterfinals

Places 5–8

7th Place

5th Place

Semifinals

3rd Place

Final

Final ranking

Places to be defined

References

External links

 
 Мемориал Гранаткина. 

Valentin Granatkin Memorial
2017 in association football
2016–17 in Russian football
January 2017 sports events in Europe